Nandgaon railway station serves Nandgaon city in Nashik district in the Indian state of Maharashtra.

History
The first train in India travelled from Mumbai to Thane on 16 April 1853. By May, 1854, Great Indian Peninsula Railway's Mumbai–Thane line was extended to Kalyan. Bhusawal was set up in 1860, but the service started in the mid-1860s. The line was extended to Khandwa in 1866  and to Nagpur in 1867.

Electrification
The railways in the Niphad–Manmad–Nandagaon sector were electrified in 1968–69.

Amenities

Amenities at Nandgaon railway station include: computerized reservation office, subscriber trunk dialling/public call office booth, waiting room, retiring room.

References

External links
  Trains at Nandgaon

Railway stations in Nashik district
Bhusawal railway division
Railway stations opened in 1866
1866 establishments in India